The Jameh Mosque of Semnan belongs to the Seljuq dynasty and Timurid Empire and is located in Semnan.

Sources 

Mosques in Iran
Mosque buildings with domes
National works of Iran
Semnan